A flash drive is a portable computer drive that uses flash memory. Flash drives are the larger memory modules consisting of a number of flash chips. A flash chip is used to read the contents of a single cell, but it can write entire block of cells. They connect to a USB port and function as a folder.

Specific flash drive types 
Memory cards:
 Flash memory-based CompactFlash (CF) card (including CFast card) and XQD card (Note: some other types of CF and XQD card are not flash memory-based)
 Memory Stick (MS)
 MultiMediaCard (MMC)
 Secure Digital card (SD, SDHC, SDXC)
 SmartMedia card (SM)
 xD-Picture Card (xD)
Other:
 Solid-state drive, SSD, using flash memory (a few SSDs use DRAM or MRAM)
 USB flash drive (UFD)

See also
 Flash memory
 Comparison of memory cards

References

Solid-state computer storage media